Badnam or Badnaam may refer to:

 Badnam, 1990 Bengali film
 Badnaam, 1966 Pakistani film
 Badnaam (band) from Pakistan
 Badnaam (TV series), a 2017 Pakistani drama serial
 Badnami, 1946 film

See also 

 Badnam Basti, a 1971 Bollywood drama film 
 Badnam Farishte, a 1971 Bollywood court drama film
 Badnaam Gali, 2019 Indian Hindi web film